The Faculty of Medicine Vajira Hospital is a medical school located in Bangkok, Thailand. The Faculty has its origin as a medical college, previously known as BMA Medical College & Vajira Hospital. The school is run in collaboration with Vajira Hospital, Mahidol University and the Bangkok Metropolitan Administration Medical Department. The Faculty has become a part of the newly established Navamindradhiraj University (formerly University of Bangkok Metropolis). The Faculty of Medicine Vajira Hospital was an affiliated college of Mahidol University between 1985 to 2011.

History

Vajira Hospital is the fourth public hospital built in Siam, founded in 1913 (B.E. 2455) by H.M. the King Vajiravudh. It is one of the first hospitals to employ modern medicine and practices. Vajira Hospital intends to provide the people of Bangkok with efficient primary health care. It was named by the King Vajiravudh, who came to open the hospital on January 2, 1913 (B.E. 2455). Its earliest buildings are located on Samsen Road, in present-day Dusit District, Bangkok.

Vajira Hospital established a medical school in 1985, the 8th in Thailand, in cooperation with Srinakharinwirot University, as the Faculty of Medicine Vajira Hospital, Srinakharinwirot University. The Faculty was organized by Vajira Hospital and was funded by the University. A few years later Bangkok Metropolitan Administration planned to start their own medical program, established as BMA Medical College (. This became an affiliated institution with Mahidol University, as the 3rd medical school of Mahidol University. In 1993, the college began opening admission process for students.

In 1998, BMA Medical College was merged with Vajira Hospital into a single organization under the name BMA Medical College and Vajira Hospital  to form a union of medical education and healthcare services.

In 2010, BMA Medical College & Vajira Hospital, along with Kuakarun College of Nursing, joined to form University of Bangkok Metropolis, with the medical school's name changed to Faculty of Medicine Vajira Hospital, University of Bangkok Metropolis. It was officially declared in the Royal Thai Government Gazette on November 12, 2010. On June 3, 2011 H.M. the King Bhumibol Adulyadej presented the university with a new formal name, Navamindradhiraj University.

Medical Education

Vajira Hospital provides medical programs for both undergraduate and postgraduate medical students. Vajira accepts about 80 students each year, and also offers various residency and fellowship programs.

Vajira runs its medical program in cooperation with Mahidol University. Prior to the 2019 academic year, medical students attend their pre-clinical studies at Mahidol University with their first year at its main campus in Salaya. In their first year, the students study basic general studies, including subjects such as Biology Chemistry, Calculus, Statistics, and Physics. Students spend their second at the Faculty of Science, Mahidol University at Mahidol University's Phayathai campus, studying pre-clinic studies and basic medicine. The rest of pre-clinical studies and clinical training, starting from 3rd year, is provided at the Faculty's campus at Vajira Hospital. This affiliation ended in 2019.

Since the 2019 academic year, medical education is taught at the Vajira Hospital campus since first year. In 2020, a program was introduced where separate cohort of medical students were trained at the Dusit Campus for the preclinical years and at Taksin Hospital in the clinical years.

Vajira is one of the country's leading medical schools in terms of medical science, clinical training and urban medication. Doctors graduated from Vajira are not only highly qualified and well trained,  but also ethical and moral. Students are well trained in areas of public service, teaching as well as research.

Departments

Department of Anatomical Pathology
Department of Anesthesiology
Department of Basic Medical Sciences
Department of Clinical Pathology
Department of Emergency Medicine
Department of Forensic Medicine
Department of Medical Research and Innovation
Department of Medicine
Department of Obstetrics and Gynaecology
Department of Ophthalmology
Department of Orthopedic Surgery
Department of Otolaryngology
Department of Pediatrics
Department of Psychiatry
Department of Radiologic Technology
Department of Radiology
Department of Rehabilitation Medicine
Department of Surgery
Department of Urban Medicine

Programs 
The faculty offers three undergraduate programs related to medical and allied health sciences.

Main Teaching Hospital 

Vajira Hospital

Teaching Hospital Affiliates 

 Taksin Hospital (MEC, Taksin Hospital, Medical Service Department, BMA)

See also

 List of medical schools in Thailand
 Mahidol University
 Navamindradhiraj University

References

External links
 Faculty of Medicine Vajira Hospital official website

Vajira
Mahidol University
Educational institutions established in 1985
Educational institutions established in 1993
Navamindradhiraj University
1985 establishments in Thailand
1993 establishments in Thailand
University departments in Thailand